Galinthiadidae is a family of 24 African mantis species (order Mantodea) in four genera.

Taxonomy
Genera:
Congoharpax
Galinthias
Harpagomantis
Pseudoharpax

See also

 List of mantis genera and species
 Flower mantis

References

External links

 
Mantodea families